Mex Urtizberea (born October 25, 1960 in Buenos Aires, Argentina) is an Argentine musician, actor, writer, conductor and comedian.

In 1980, Mex formed a group called MIA (Músicos Independientes Asociados), along with Lito Vitale. Then in 1988, he made his first album with his band La Sonora del Plata. Then in 1994, along with Alfredo Casero and Lito Vitale, recorded Gestando a la Halibour.

External links
 Official Home Page

References

1960 births
Argentine male actors
Argentine male writers
Argentine comedians
Living people